Song of the Cornfields (Hungarian: Ének a búzamezőkről) is a 1947 Hungarian drama film, based on a novel by Ferenc Móra, directed by István Szőts and starring Alice Szellay, János Görbe and József Bihari. A Hungarian soldier returning from fighting in the Second World War marries the woman he believes to be the widow of a former comrade who he thinks died in the Prisoner of War camp in which they were held.

Song of the Cornfields was one of only three Hungarian films to be made in 1947, as the film industry struggled to recover from the destruction of the final war years. It was the second film directed by Szőts, following up his well-received 1942 debut People of the Mountains which featured several of the same cast members. The film was banned in Hungary because of its depiction of the controversial issue of Hungarian prisoners held by the Soviets. The Hungarian Communist leader Mátyás Rákosi walked out of a screening in protest, and the film was not shown again in Hungary until 1979. Szőts' next scheduled film Treasured Earth was taken away from him and given to Frigyes Bán to direct.

Cast
 Alice Szellay as Etel 
 János Görbe as Ferenc 
 József Bihari as Mátyás
 Marcsa Simon   
 László Bánhidi   
 Lajos Gárday  
 Jenö Danis
 László Joó   
 Erzsi Kõmíves
 Viola Orbán 
 Károly Rácz 
 Eszter Sándor 
 Gyöngyi Váradi

References

Bibliography
 Cunningham, John. Hungarian Cinema: From Coffee House to Multiplex. Wallflower Press, 2004.

External links

1947 films
1947 drama films
Hungarian drama films
1940s Hungarian-language films
Films directed by István Szőts
Films based on Hungarian novels
Films set in Hungary
Hungarian black-and-white films
Film controversies in Hungary
Hungarian World War I films